2 of One is a video album by American heavy metal band Metallica. It was released on June 6, 1989, through Elektra Entertainment and features two versions of the group's first music video, "One", from their fourth studio album ...And Justice for All. 

The music video was directed by Bill Pope and Michael Salomon and was filmed in Los Angeles, California. It features clips from Dalton Trumbo's anti-war film Johnny Got His Gun (1971). All parts of 2 of One are included on the DVD The Videos 1989–2004, released in 2006.

Track listing

Certifications

External links

Official website

Metallica video albums
Albums with cover art by Pushead
1989 video albums
Music video compilation albums
1989 compilation albums
Elektra Records compilation albums
Elektra Records video albums
Metallica compilation albums